Sheyenne may be

 Sheyenne, North Dakota, USA; a city in Eton County
 Sheyenne River, a river in North Dakota, USA
 Sheyenne Lake, Sheridan County, ND, USA; a lake found in the Sheyenne Lake National Wildlife Refuge
 Sheyenne, a cultivar of the American Elm, see Ulmus americana 'Sheyenne'

See also

 
 
 
 Sheyenne River Bridge (disambiguation)
Cheyenne (disambiguation)